Reidsville is a city in Rockingham County in the U.S. state of North Carolina. At the 2020 census, the city had a total population of 14,583. Reidsville is included in the Greensboro–High Point Metropolitan Statistical Area of the Piedmont Triad.

Reidsville was established in the early 19th century as an outpost and stop on the stage line that ran between Salisbury, North Carolina, and Danville, Virginia, and was originally known as Wright's Crossroads. The community grew from a single home and inn owned by the family of Reuben Reid, a local farmer, businessman, justice of the peace and father of David S. Reid), into a thriving farming community primarily supporting tobacco production and cigarette manufacturing. Reidsville was officially incorporated by the North Carolina State Legislature in 1873 and became a key location of the American Tobacco Company which employed large numbers of city and county residents. The American Tobacco Company was the mainstay of Reidsville economics until its sale and closure in 1994. Many textile mills were established in Reidsville as well, with Cone Mills and Burlington Industries, located in Burlington North Carolina, consolidating most of them in the mid-20th century, although most have now closed. Although Reidsville has experienced economic recession in recent years the community has enjoyed a renewal of growth as a sleeper city supplying a source of rural development for the surrounding larger cities.

History

The roots of Reidsville date back to the early 19th century when William Wright of the Little Troublesome Creek area owned a tavern and store on the road connecting Danville and Salem. This outpost, called Wright's Crossroads, was the earliest settlement in the present-day city and was overseen by Wright's son, Nathan, and then Nathan Wright's son-in-law, Robert Payne Richardson. Richardson's home, built in 1842 on a knoll overlooking Little Troublesome Creek, still remains on Richardson Drive and has the distinction of being the oldest standing house in the city.

Reuben Reid of the Hogan's Creek area moved his family, including wife, Elizabeth Williams Settle, and son, David Settle Reid, to a  farm on the ridge between Wolf Island and Little Troublesome creeks in May 1814. Reuben Reid became a successful farmer, operated a store and a public inn maintained in a private home and served the county as a constable and justice of the peace. When the family secured a post office, aptly named Reidsville, in 1829, 16-year-old David Reid was appointed its first postmaster. He later became a State Senator (1835–42), a U.S. Congressman (1843–47), Governor of North Carolina (1850) and a U.S. Senator (1854).

On November 26, 1858, William Lindsey of Pittsylvania County, Virginia, was high bidder for a  tract of land known as Reidsville. He and his bride, Sarah Holderby, a daughter of Joseph Holderby of the northern part of the county, moved into the frame house Reuben Reid had built across from his store. It is now a landmark in Reidsville, the first frame house built in the village.

Reidsville is located in east-central Rockingham County. The Southern Railroad passes through the center of the city from north to south. The town was incorporated in 1873 by the Legislature. Tobacco was a mainstay of the local economy for many years, with the history of the city tightly woven with that of American Tobacco Company. With the sale of American Tobacco in 1994, city leaders have diversified the local economy. The Reidsville Chamber of Commerce, established in 1923 by business leaders in the community, is now located downtown.

The Chinqua-Penn Plantation, First Baptist Church, Jennings-Baker House, Richardson Houses Historic District, Reuben Wallace McCollum House, North Washington Avenue Workers' House, Penn House, Gov. David S. Reid House, Reidsville High School, Former, and Reidsville Historic District are listed on the National Register of Historic Places.

Geography
The total area is 10.14% water.

Downtown area

The downtown area of Reidsville was like many of its counterparts across the state in the 1970s, seeing a decline in business opportunities due to the emergence of malls and shopping centers. The Reidsville Downtown Corporation, a non-profit organization financed by monies from the Downtown District Tax, was created in 1976 to lead the charge to revitalize the downtown.

Joint projects of the Downtown Corporation and the City of Reidsville have been participation in the Main Street Program, the Streetscape Program and Façade Incentive Grant program. Each of these programs was initiated to aid in the revitalization of the downtown and improve the area aesthetically.

Demographics

2020 census

As of the 2020 United States census, there were 14,583 people, 6,166 households, and 3,565 families residing in the city.

2010 census
At the 2010 census, there were 14,520 people, 6,013 households and 3,902 families residing in the city. The population density was 1,083.1 per square mile (418.3/km). There were 6,477 housing units at an average density of 484.3 per square mile (187.0/km).  The racial makeup of the city was 57.02% White, 39.52% African American, 0.21% Native American, 0.64% Asian, 0.06% Pacific Islander, 1.35% from other races, and 1.19% from two or more races. 2.63% of the population were Hispanic or Latino of any race.

There were 6,013 households, of which 27.5% had children under the age of 18 living with them, 42.7% were married couples living together, 18.3% had a female householder with no husband present, and 35.1% were non-families. 31.3% of all households were made up of individuals, and 14.4% had someone living alone who was 65 years of age or older.  The average household size was 2.34 and the average family size was 2.92.

23.4% of the population were under the age of 18, 6.8% from 18 to 24, 28.0% from 25 to 44, 23.0% from 45 to 64, and 18.8% who were 65 years of age or older. The median age was 40 years. For every 100 females, there were 84.2 males. For every 100 females age 18 and over, there were 78.0 males.

The median household income was $31,040 and the median family income was $37,553. Males had a median income of $30,745 versus $21,991 for females. The per capita income for the city was $17,414. 15.1% of the population and 11.6% of families were below the poverty line.  23.9% of those under the age of 18 and 14.7% of those 65 and older were living below the poverty line.

Notable people
 Scott Bankhead – Olympic athlete and Major League Baseball player
  B.J. Barham - Musician lead singer of American Aquarium 
 Na Brown – graduated from Reidsville High, played for UNC and Philadelphia Eagles
 Nelson Cole – North Carolina State Representative
 Jim Duncan – football player and coach
 Mike Goodes – PGA Champions Tour golfer
 Ione Grogan – academic, mathematician, educator
 Lindsey Hopkins Sr. – American businessman, financier and philanthropist
 Walter Hooper – American Author, Professor, and advisor to the estate of C.S. Lewis 
 Jennifer King – first full-time black female coach in NFL history.
 Janet Paschal – Singer, songwriter, author
 H. Jefferson Powell – Former Principal Deputy Solicitor General of the U.S., American Lawyer, Professor
 Bill Lindsey – Chicago White Sox and New York Yankees baseball catcher
 David Settle Reid – two-term Democratic governor of North Carolina from 1851 to 1854, and a U.S. Senator from December 1854 to March 1859
 Tony Rice – bluegrass musician
 R. Stephen Ritchie – the only U.S. Air Force pilot ace of the Vietnam War
 John Settle – NFL player, Cleveland Browns running back coach
 Jerome Simpson – former NFL wide receiver
 Tripp Welborne – Michigan Wolverines and the Minnesota Vikings safety
Max Drake (born 1952), musician
J. Dana Trent –  American author, professor, and minister

Accolades
 All-America City Award – 2008

References

External links

Cities in North Carolina
Cities in Rockingham County, North Carolina
Populated places established in 1842
1842 establishments in North Carolina